Ruslan Amirjanov (born 1 February 1985, in Mingachevir, Soviet Union) is an Azerbaijani defender who plays for the Keşla FK professional football club.

Career

Club
On 23 May 2014, Amirjanov signed a one-year contract with Gabala FC.

Amirjanov was released by Sabail FK at the end of the 2017–18 season.

On 30 August 2018, Amirjanov signed a one-year contract with Keşla FK.

International
Ruslan debuted for Azerbaijan in 2008, and so far has 3 caps.

Career statistics

Club

International

Statistics accurate as of match played 3 September 2014

Achievements
Neftchi Baku
Azerbaijan Premier League (2): 2010–11, 2011–12

References

External links
 

Azerbaijani footballers
Azerbaijan international footballers
1985 births
Living people
FK Standard Sumgayit players
Gabala FC players
Sabail FK players
People from Mingachevir
Association football defenders
Neftçi PFK players